Lone Tree or Lonetree can refer to:

Cities or towns
Lone Tree, Colorado
Lone Tree, Indiana
Lone Tree, Iowa
Lone Tree, Missouri
Lone Tree, Oklahoma
Lone Tree Corners, Illinois
Lonetree, Montana
Lonetree, Wyoming

Townships or municipalities
Rural Municipality of Lone Tree No. 18, Saskatchewan
Lone Tree Township, Clay County, Iowa
Lone Tree Township, Minnesota
Lone Tree Township, Clay County, Nebraska
Lone Tree Township, Merrick County, Nebraska

Monuments and cemeteries
Lone Tree Cemetery, Fairview, California, Fairview, California
Lone Tree Commonwealth War Graves Commission Cemetery, Heuvelland, Belgium
Lone Tree Monument

Creeks
Lone Tree Creek (Colorado), a tributary that joins the South Platte River in Weld County, Colorado east of Greeley
Lone Tree Creek, San Joaquin County, a stream tributary to the San Joaquin River, in San Joaquin County and Stanislaus County, California

People
Clayton J. Lonetree, a person

Other
Lone Tree Brewery, an Israeli brewery in Gush Etzion
Lone Tree Ferry, a historical ferry in Omaha, Nebraska
Lone Tree Community School District, a public school district based in Lone Tree, Johnson County, Iowa, USA